A statue of Charles Devens by Olin Levi Warner, sometimes called General Charles Devens, is installed along the Charles River Esplanade, in Boston, Massachusetts, United States.

Description and history
Previously, the bronze sculpture was installed outside the Boston State House, until 1950. It was designed in 1894, cast in 1895, and dedicated in 1986. The statue measures approximately 7 x 3 x 3 ft, and rests on a granite sculpture measuring approximately 7 x 3 x 3 ft. It was surveyed as part of the Smithsonian Institution's "Save Outdoor Sculpture!" program in 1997.

References

External links

 

1890s sculptures
Bronze sculptures in Massachusetts
Charles River Esplanade
Granite sculptures in Massachusetts
Monuments and memorials in Boston
Outdoor sculptures in Boston
Sculptures of men in Massachusetts
Statues in Boston